The Scotland national under-20 football team, controlled by the Scottish Football Association, is Scotland's national under 20 football team and is considered to be a feeder team for the Scotland national football team. The team represents Scotland in international Under 20 competitions such as the FIFA U-20 World Cup.

History 

Scotland reached the quarter-finals of the World Youth Championship on two occasions: in 1983, where they lost to eventual winners Poland; and in 1987, when tournament runners-up West Germany won on penalties. The team last played in a competitive tournament in the 2007 FIFA U-20 World Cup, which Scotland qualified for by finishing second in the 2006 UEFA European Under-19 Championship.

An under-20 team was selected for the 2017 Toulon Tournament, the first time since 1999 Scotland competed.  Scotland registered a first ever win against Brazil at any level in the groups. The team finished with the bronze medal, which was the nations first ever medal in the competitions 45 year history.

Competitive record

FIFA World Youth Championship / FIFA U-20 World Cup record

Other tournaments

Squad 
The following squad was selected for a friendly match with Turkey under-20s in November 2018.

Past squads 

 1983 FIFA U-20 World Cup squad
 1987 FIFA U-20 World Cup squad
 2007 FIFA U-20 World Cup squad

References

External links
 SFA (under 20s)
 FIFA Under-20 website

F
European national under-20 association football teams
Youth football in Scotland